Ganesella is a genus of air-breathing land snails, terrestrial pulmonate gastropod mollusks in the subfamily Camaeninae of the family Camaenidae.

Species
Species within the genus Ganesella include:

 Ganesella acris (Benson, 1859)
 Ganesella aegistoides Yen, 1939
 Ganesella apex (Quadras & Möllendorff, 1896)
 Ganesella bantamensis (E. A. Smith, 1887)
 Ganesella bertiniana (Tapparone Canefri, 1880)
 Ganesella capitium (Benson, 1848)
 Ganesella carinella (Möllendorff, 1902)
 Ganesella catocyrta (Quadras & Möllendorff, 1895)
 Ganesella concavospira (Möllendorff, 1901)
 Ganesella conispira Yen, 1939
 Ganesella demangei (Dautzenberg & H. Fischer, 1907)
 Ganesella dormitans (Heude, 1882)
 Ganesella emma (L. Pfeiffer, 1863)
 Ganesella esau (Gredler, 1887)
 Ganesella eximia (Möllendorff, 1901)
 Ganesella fernandezi (Hidalgo, 1890)
 Ganesella fulvescens (Dautzenberg & H. Fischer, 1908)
 Ganesella gouldi (L. Pfeiffer, 1845)
 Ganesella halabalah Sutcharit & Panha, 2019
 Ganesella hariola (Benson, 1856)
 Ganesella huberi Thach, 2018
 Ganesella hyperteleia (Morlet, 1892)
 Ganesella infrastriata (E. A. Smith, 1884)
 Ganesella lepidostola (Heude, 1882)
 Ganesella leptopomopsis (Dautzenberg & H. Fischer, 1908)
 † Ganesella martini Oostingh 1935 
 Ganesella microbembix Haas, 1935
 Ganesella microtrochus (Möllendorff, 1887)
 Ganesella modesta I. Rensch, 1931
 Ganesella oxytropis (Möllendorff, 1901)
 Ganesella palananica (Quadras & Möllendorff, 1896)
 Ganesella papuana Thiele, 1928
 Ganesella perakensis (Crosse, 1879)
 Ganesella phonica (Mabille, 1887)
 Ganesella planasi (Hidalgo, 1890)
 Ganesella platyconus (Möllendorff, 1901)
 Ganesella poecilotrochus (Möllendorff, 1894)
 Ganesella procera Gude, 1902
 Ganesella producta (Dautzenberg & H. Fischer, 1908)
 Ganesella rostrella (L. Pfeiffer, 1863)
 Ganesella rufofilosa (Bock, 1881)
 Ganesella saurivonga (Bavay & Dautzenberg, 1900)
 Ganesella schomburgiana (Möllendorff, 1884)
 Ganesella sitalina (Gredler, 1887)
 Ganesella sphaerotrochus Vermeulen, 1996
 Ganesella squamulina (Gredler, 1884)
 Ganesella stenodesma (Quadras & Möllendorff, 1896)
 Ganesella straminea (Möllendorff, 1901)
 Ganesella subflava (Godwin-Austen, 1891)
 Ganesella subsquamulata (Heude, 1890)
 Ganesella substraminea (Bavay & Dautzenberg, 1909)
 Ganesella subtrochus Yen, 1939
 Ganesella ternaria (Heude, 1890)
 Ganesella thachi F. Huber, 2018
 Ganesella thoracica (Heude, 1882)
 Ganesella tigaensis (Godwin-Austen, 1891)
 Ganesella trochacea (Gredler, 1885)
 Ganesella trochus (Möllendorff, 1887)
 Ganesella vatheleti (Bavay & Dautzenberg, 1899)
 Ganesella virilis (Gredler, 1887)

Species brought into synonymy
 Ganesella adelinae Pilsbry, 1902 : synonym of Satsuma (Luchuhadra) adelinae (Pilsbry, 1902) represented as Satsuma adelinae (Pilsbry, 1902) (original combination)
 Ganesella albida (H. Adams, 1870) : synonym of Satsuma albida (H. Adams, 1870)
 Ganesella batanica (A. Adams & Reeve, 1850) : synonym of Pancala batanica (A. Adams & Reeve, 1850) : synonym of Satsuma (Coniglobus) batanica (A. Adams & Reeve, 1850) represented as Satsuma batanica (A. Adams & Reeve, 1850) (unaccepted combination)
 Ganesella brevibarbis (L. Pfeiffer, 1859) : synonym of Plectotropis brevibarbis (L. Pfeiffer, 1859) (unaccepted combination)
 Ganesella cardiostoma (Kobelt, 1879) : synonym of Satsuma cardiostoma (Kobelt, 1879) (unaccepted combination)
 Ganesella citrina Zilch, 1940 : synonym of Satsuma mellea stenozona (Möllendorff, 1884) represented as Satsuma mellea (L. Pfeiffer, 1866) (junior synonym)
 Ganesella coudeini (Bavay & Dautzenberg, 1900) : synonym of Aegista coudeini (Bavay & Dautzenberg, 1900)
 Ganesella cristata Pilsbry, 1902 : synonym of Satsuma cristata (Pilsbry, 1902) (original combination)
 Ganesella erabuana Kuroda, 1958 : synonym of Satsuma eucosmia erabuana (Kuroda, 1958) (original combination)
 Ganesella fausta Pilsbry, 1902 : synonym of Satsuma fausta (Pilsbry, 1902) (original combination)
 Ganesella ferruginea Pilsbry, 1900 : synonym of Satsuma ferruginea (Pilsbry, 1900) (original combination)
 Ganesella galea (Benson, 1859) : synonym of Sesara galea (Benson, 1859)
 Ganesella jacobii Pilsbry, 1900 : synonym of Satsuma jacobii (Pilsbry, 1900) (original combination)
 Ganesella japonica (L. Pfeiffer, 1847) : synonym of Satsuma (Satsuma) japonica (L. Pfeiffer, 1847) represented as Satsuma japonica (L. Pfeiffer, 1847)
 Ganesella kanamarui Hirase, 1909 : synonym of Satsuma kanamarui (Hirase, 1909) (original combination)
 Ganesella lamyi (Dautzenberg & H. Fischer, 1905) : synonym of Ganesella emma (L. Pfeiffer, 1863) (junior synonym)
 Ganesella largillierti (L. Pfeiffer, 1849) : synonym of Satsuma largillierti (L. Pfeiffer, 1849) (unaccepted generic combination)
 Ganesella moellendorffiana Pilsbry & Hirase, 1903 : synonym of Satsuma moellendorffiana (Pilsbry & Hirase, 1903) (original combination)
 Ganesella murensis Cockerell, 1926 : synonym of Bradybaena virgo (Pilsbry, 1927) (junior synonym)
 Ganesella myomphala (Martens, 1865) : synonym of Satsuma myomphala (Martens, 1865)
 Ganesella notoensis Pilsbry & Y. Hirase, 1903 : synonym of Satsuma papilliformis (Kobelt, 1875) (junior synonym)
 Ganesella nux (Möllendorff, 1888) : synonym of Satsuma nux (Möllendorff, 1888) (unaccepted combination)
 Ganesella optima Pilsbry, 1902 : synonym of Trishoplita optima (Pilsbry, 1902) (original combination)
 Ganesella polygyrata van Benthem Jutting, 1933 : synonym of Coxia polygyrata (van Benthem Jutting, 1933) (original combination)
 Ganesella rhombostoma (L. Pfeiffer, 1861) : synonym of Anceyoconcha rhombostoma (L. Pfeiffer, 1861) (unaccepted combination)
 Ganesella satsuma Pilsbry, 1900 : synonym of Satsuma japonica satsuma (Pilsbry, 1900) (original combination and rank)
 Ganesella selasia Pilsbry, 1902 : synonym of Satsuma selasia (Pilsbry, 1902)
 Ganesella sororcula Pilsbry, 1902 : synonym of Satsuma sororcula (Pilsbry, 1902) (original combination)
 Ganesella stearnsii Pilsbry, 1895 : synonym of Satsuma papilliformis (Kobelt, 1875) (junior synonym)
 Ganesella tanegashimae Pilsbry, 1901 : synonym of Satsuma tanegashimae (Pilsbry, 1901) (original combination)
 Ganesella thaanumi Pilsbry, 1924 : synonym of Satsuma moellendorffiana thaanumi (Pilsbry, 1924) (original combination)
 Ganesella tokunoshimana Pilsbry & Hirase, 1904 : synonym of Satsuma (Luchuhadra) tokunoshimana (Pilsbry & Hirase, 1904) represented as Satsuma tokunoshimana (Pilsbry & Hirase, 1904) (original combination)
 Ganesella turrita Gude, 1900 : synonym of Pseudobuliminus turrita (Gude, 1900) (original combination)
 Ganesella virgo Pilsbry, 1927 : synonym of Bradybaena virgo (Pilsbry, 1927) (original combination)
 Ganesella weiskei Fulton, 1902 : synonym of Paratrochus weiskei (Fulton, 1902) (original combination)

References

 Bank, R. A. (2017). Classification of the Recent terrestrial Gastropoda of the World. Last update: July 16, 2017

External links
 Blanford, W. T. (1863). On Indian species of land-shells belonging to the genera Helix, Linn., and Nanina, Gray. Annals and Magazine of Natural History, Series 3. 11: 81-86
 Budha, P.; Mordan, P.; Naggs, F.; Backeljau, T. (2012). Darwininitium – a new fully pseudosigmurethrous orthurethran genus from Nepal (Gastropoda, Pulmonata, Cerastidae). ZooKeys. 175: 19-26
 Nevill, G. (1878). Hand List of Mollusca in the Indian Museum, Calcutta. Part I. Gastropoda. Pulmonata and Prosobranchia-Neurobranchia, xv + 338 pp. [> 1 December. Calcutta (Office of the Superintendent of Government Printing).]
 Sutcharit, C.; Backeljau, T.; Panha, S. (2019). Re-description of the type species of the genera Ganesella Blanford, 1863 and Globotrochus Haas, 1935; with description of a new Ganesella species from Thailand (Eupulmonata, Camaenidae). ZooKeys. 870: 51-76
 Pilsbry, H. A. (1893-1895). Manual of conchology, structural and systematic, with illustrations of the species, Second series: Pulmonata. Vol. IX. Helicidae, Vol. 7, Guide to the study of Helices

Camaenidae